Leidos Field at Ripken Stadium is the home of the Aberdeen IronBirds, an affiliate of the Baltimore Orioles in the South Atlantic League. The stadium is located in Aberdeen, Maryland. The 6,300-seat Ripken Stadium held its first game on June 18, 2002. As of 2011 the team had sold out every home game at Ripken Stadium since it began playing there in 2002.

The stadium is part of Cal Ripken Jr.'s Aberdeen Complex in his hometown of Aberdeen, Maryland, located just off Interstate 95 at Maryland Route 22. Leidos Field at Ripken Stadium is only 2.9 miles off the East Coast Greenway. The complex also includes several smaller fields for local youth sports leagues, as well as an adjacent Marriott hotel. The stadium is the closest structure of the complex to the highway, with the right field fence and scoreboard visible from it. The stadium hosts soccer matches as well.

The expansive parking lot of Ripken Stadium is frequently used as a venue for SCCA autocross racing for many racers on the east coast.

Features
The stadium features a three-tiered cafe behind home plate, available for patrons who want to have dinner and drinks during a game. The upper level has a press box behind home plate, 256 club seats and six skyboxes. Ripken Stadium was one of the first short-season Single-A ballparks to have a fully enclosed club level and skyboxes. A new synthetic turf playing surface and LED sports lighting were installed prior to the 2021 regular season.

Notable events
In 2009, The Maryland Redbirds, of the Cal Ripken Sr. Collegiate Baseball League, (the CRSCBL), played all weekday games and one weekend doubleheader at the stadium. The CRSCBL previously used the stadium for the annual all-star game in 2005 and 2007. The stadium also hosted the inaugural Ripken Cup collegiate baseball invitational between University of Maryland and Towson University on April 15, 2014 and May 7, 2014. The 2016 Big East Conference baseball tournament was held in Aberdeen May 26–29.

References

External links

Official Website
Aberdeen Ironbirds: Ripken Stadium
Maryland Stadium Authority: Ripken Stadium
Ripken Stadium Views – Ball Parks of the Minor Leagues

Baseball venues in Maryland
Minor league baseball venues
Soccer venues in Maryland
Aberdeen, Maryland
2002 establishments in Maryland
College baseball venues in the United States
Sports venues completed in 2002
South Atlantic League ballparks